The 1934 NFL season was the 15th regular season of the National Football League. Before the season, the Portsmouth Spartans moved from Ohio to Detroit, Michigan, and were renamed the Detroit Lions.

The Cincinnati Reds lost their first eight games, then were suspended for not paying league dues. The St. Louis Gunners, an independent team, played the last three games of the Reds' 1934 schedule in their stead.

The Ed Thorp Memorial Trophy was established as the league's award for the NFL champion, and was awarded through 1967. The host team for the NFL Championship Game would now alternate between the two divisions, with the Eastern Division champion hosting in even-numbered years, and the Western champion hosting in odd-numbered years.

The season ended with the NFL Championship Game when the New York Giants defeated the Chicago Bears at the Polo Grounds in what has become known as the "Sneakers Game".

Major rule changes
A hand-to-hand forward pass made behind the line of scrimmage that becomes incomplete (hits the ground before it is caught) is to be ruled as a fumble.
Incomplete passes no longer result in a five-yard penalty

Final standings

NFL Championship Game

N.Y. Giants 30, Chi. Bears 13 at Polo Grounds, New York City, December 9, 1934

League leaders

Coaching changes
Cincinnati Reds: Algy Clark served as head coach, replacing Al Jolley and Mike Palm (who served three and seven games of the previous season, respectively).
Pittsburgh Pirates: Forrest Douds was replaced by Luby DiMeolo.
St. Louis Gunners: The team entered the league with Chile Walsh as head coach.

Stadium changes
 The Cincinnati Reds played each of the four home games at different stadiums: Cincinnati's Crosley Field, Dayton's Triangle Park, Portsmouth's Universal Stadium, and Xavier University's Corcoran Stadium.
 The relocated Detroit Lions moved from Portsmouth's Universal Stadium to University of Detroit Stadium
 The Green Bay Packers home games in Milwaukee moved from Borchert Field to Wisconsin State Fair Park
 The St. Louis Gunners played their home games at Sportsman's Park

References

 NFL Record and Fact Book
 NFL History 1931–1940 (Last accessed December 4, 2005)
 
 Total Football: The Official Encyclopedia of the National Football League

National Football League seasons